Alberto Clò (born 1947) is an Italian businessman, politician and academic. He served as minister of industry from 1995 to 1996. He has been also director of the Italian company Eni SpA.

Early life and education
Clò was born in 1947. He holds a political sciences degree from the University of Bologna.

Career
Clò worked as a full professor of applied economics at the department of economics at the University of Bologna where he was promoted to the rank of associate professor of industrial economy in 1987. In 1980 he founded and edited a magazine entitled Energia. From 1995 to 1996 he served as minister of industry from January 1995 to May 1996 and ad interim minister of foreign trade in the cabinet led by Prime Minister Lamberto Dini. In addition, Clò was the president of the council of industry and energy ministers of the European Union during the six-month Italian presidency in the same period.

He was the director of Eni SpA since June 1999 and also former director of various other firms including Atlantia SpA, Italcementi SpA, De Longhi SpA and IREN SpA. In April 2012, Clò was appointed the Advanced Capital's special advisor for investments in the energy sector. In 2013, he was named independent director of the Snam SpA.

Works

Translated works

Awards
Clò has been awarded Cavaliere di Gran Croce (Knight of Great Cross) of the Republic of Italy in 1996.

References

External links

20th-century Italian businesspeople
20th-century  Italian economists
21st-century Italian businesspeople
1947 births
Eni
Government ministers of Italy
Italian magazine founders
Living people
Knights Grand Cross of the Order of Merit of the Italian Republic
University of Bologna alumni
Academic staff of the University of Bologna
Independent politicians in Italy